"Do What You Can" is a song recorded by Bon Jovi. It was first released on July 23, 2020 as the fourth single from Bon Jovi's 2020 album. A new version of the song featuring Sugarland singer Jennifer Nettles was released as a single on September 23, 2020. This marks Bon Jovi and Nettles' second collaboration after 2006's "Who Says You Can't Go Home".

Background
During the early days of the COVID-19 lockdowns, instead of playing the complete song, Bon Jovi played only the first verse and chorus and then asked fans to write their verse and tell their story. He received thousands of fan-created verses on social media. The final version of the song, written by Bon Jovi, was performed live acoustically on Jersey4Jersey benefit concert, raising six million dollars for the state of New Jersey which was hard hit during the pandemic.

Music video
The music video was uploaded on August 25, 2020. The song and the video are a tribute to the citizens and workers of New York City for their efforts during the COVID-19 pandemic. A video featuring Jennifer Nettles was released on September 18, 2020.

Charts

Weekly charts

Year-end charts

References

2020 singles
2020 songs
Bon Jovi songs
Jennifer Nettles songs
Island Records singles
Male–female vocal duets
Songs written by Jon Bon Jovi
Songs about the COVID-19 pandemic
Country pop songs
Song recordings produced by John Shanks
Song recordings produced by Jon Bon Jovi